Crackers is a Christmas-themed Australian comedy film starring Daniel Kellie, Susan Lyons and Peter Rowsthorn. It was released on 9 July 1998 by Beyond Films. It was written and directed by David Swann.

Plot
During the Christmas holidays, Hilary Dredge (Susan Lyons) and her son, Joey (Daniel Kellie), travel into the suburbs to spend Christmas with Joey's grandparents. To accompany them on the trip, Hilary's boyfriend Bruno (Peter Rowsthorn) and his son Angus (Christopher Chapman) go with them. Joey does not like Bruno because of his relationship with his mother. Joey and Angus have a violent rivalry with each other because of this, as Angus is unimpressed when Joey shows disrespect to his father.

Cast 
 Daniel Kellie as Joey Dredge
 Susan Lyons as Hilary Dredge
 Peter Rowsthorn as Bruno
 Warren Mitchell as Albert Hall
 Christopher Chapman as Angus
 Terry Gill as Jack Hall
 Valerie Bader as Aunt Dottie
 Maggie King as Violet 'Vi' Hall
 Louis Siversen as Teacher #1
 Ross Williams as Vice Principal
 Rainey Carah as Driver #1

Production
Swann made the film after his successful short Bonza.

Reception
Crackers grossed $1,263,230 at the box office in Australia. The film was re-released on DVD in November 2010.

See also
Cinema of Australia
List of Christmas films

References

External links
Crackers at IMDb
Crackers at Rotten Tomatoes
Crackers at Oz Movies

Australian Christmas comedy films
Films shot in Melbourne
1990s Christmas comedy films
1998 comedy films
1998 films
1990s English-language films
1990s Australian films